In mathematics, a Ford circle is a circle in the Euclidean plane, in a family of circles that are all tangent to the -axis at rational points. It is tangent to the -axis at its bottom point, .

History
Ford circles are a special case of mutually tangent circles; the base line can be thought of as a circle with infinite radius. Systems of mutually tangent circles were studied by Apollonius of Perga, after whom the problem of Apollonius and the Apollonian gasket are named.  In the 17th century René Descartes discovered Descartes' theorem, a relationship between the reciprocals of the radii of mutually tangent circles.

Ford circles also appear in the Sangaku (geometrical puzzles) of Japanese mathematics. A typical problem, which is presented on an 1824 tablet in the Gunma Prefecture, covers the relationship of three touching circles with a common tangent. Given the size of the two outer large circles, what is the size of the small circle between them? The answer is equivalent to a Ford circle:

Ford circles are named after the American mathematician Lester R. Ford, Sr., who wrote about them in 1938.

Properties

In addition, the line  is counted as a Ford circle – it can be thought of as the Ford circle associated with infinity, which is the case 

Two different Ford circles are either disjoint or tangent to one another. No two interiors of Ford circles intersect, even though there is a Ford circle tangent to the x-axis at each point on it with rational coordinates. If  is between 0 and 1, the Ford circles that are tangent to  can be described variously as
 the circles  where 

The centers of the Ford circles constitute a discrete (and hence countable) subset of the plane, whose closure is the real axis - an uncountable set.

Ford circles can also be thought of as curves in the complex plane. The modular group of transformations of the complex plane maps Ford circles to other Ford circles.

By interpreting the upper half of the complex plane as a model of the hyperbolic plane (the Poincaré half-plane model), Ford circles can be interpreted as horocycles.
In hyperbolic geometry any two horocycles are congruent. When these horocycles are circumscribed by apeirogons they tile the hyperbolic plane with an order-3 apeirogonal tiling.

Total area of Ford circles
There is a link between the area of Ford circles, Euler's totient function  the Riemann zeta function  and Apéry's constant  As no two Ford circles intersect, it follows immediately that the total area of the Ford circles

is less than 1. In fact the total area of these Ford circles is given by a convergent sum, which can be evaluated. From the definition, the area is

Simplifying this expression gives

where the last equality reflects the Dirichlet generating function for Euler's totient function  Since  this finally becomes

Note that as a matter of convention, the previous calculations excluded the circle of radius  corresponding to the fraction .

Ford spheres (3D) 

The concept of Ford circles can be generalized from the rational numbers to the Gaussian rationals, giving Ford spheres. In this construction, the complex numbers are embedded as a plane in a three-dimensional Euclidean space, and for each Gaussian rational point in this plane one constructs a sphere tangent to the plane at that point.

See also
 Apollonian gasket – a fractal with infinite mutually tangential circles in a circle instead of on a line
 Steiner chain
 Pappus chain

References

External links
 Ford's Touching Circles at cut-the-knot
 
 

Circle packing
Fractions (mathematics)